Clearview Airpark  is an airport located in Westminster, Maryland, United States.

Clearview Airpark houses 30 general aviation aircraft with 15,300 operations annually (2011). The airport has been in operation since 1966.

References

External links 

Airports in Maryland
1966 establishments in Maryland